Calathus syriacus is a species of ground beetle from the Platyninae subfamily that can be found on Cyprus, in Ukraine and in southern part of Russia. It is also found in Azerbaijan, Armenia, Georgia, Greece, Iran, Israel, Lebanon, Syria and Turkey.

References

syriacus
Beetles described in 1863
Beetles of Europe